Kershaw is an English-language surname.

Kershaw may also refer to:

Places in the United States
 Kershaw, South Carolina
 Kershaw County, South Carolina

Other uses
 Baron Kershaw, a title in the Peerage of the United Kingdom
 Kershaw Knives, an American cutlery company
 Kershaw Peaks, a group of peaks in Graham Land, Antarctica
 Mount Kershaw, a mountain on Blaiklock Island, Graham Land, Antarctica
 USS Kershaw (APA-176), a WWII U.S. naval transport vessel

See also